, formerly Nakano Sun Plaza, is a hotel in Nakano, Tokyo. The hotel includes a concert hall, the Nakano Sunplaza Hall (formerly Nakano Sun Plaza Hall). Built in 1973, this concert hall seats 2,222 people. The building is to be demolished and replaced by a new complex including a hotel and a concert hall capable of seating 10,000 people around 2024.

Notable events 
Sarah Vaughan's 1973 album Live in Japan was recorded at the hall. Scorpions recorded their live album, Tokyo Tapes, at this venue on April 24 & 27, 1978. Kraftwerk performed two dates here in 1981 on their Computer World tour. After the departure of Keith Levene  and Jah Wobble, Public Image Ltd consisting of John Lydon, Martin Atkins and session musicians played live at the Sunplaza on the 1 and 2 July 1983. 10 tracks from these live performances were first released on Columbia Records Japan as Live in Tokyo. Iron Maiden performed here (1981, 1982, 1985, 1996 and 1998). U2 ended their War Tour on November 30, 1983, at the plaza hall. Todd Rundgren recorded his live video Live in Japan at the hall during his Nearly Human tour in 1990. The Japanese metal band Dead End held their last concert here on January 21, 1990.  Nirvana held their final Japanese concert here on February 19, 1992. The concert portions of Dream Theater's Images and Words: Live in Tokyo video were filmed at the hall. DJ Ozma filmed his 2008 concert "Viva la Scandal Party" at the Nakano Sunplaza stop of the tour. Highlights were released as part of the exclusive box set of his final album, "I ♡ Party People 3".

References

External links 

 Official web page
 Tokyo Architecture Info
 Meyer Sound press release

Music venues in Tokyo
Hotels in Tokyo
Nakano, Tokyo
Hotel buildings completed in 1973
Music venues completed in 1973
1973 establishments in Japan